David Erik Johan Mitov Nilsson (born 12 January 1991) is a professional footballer who plays for Sirius as a goalkeeper. Born in Sweden, he represents the North Macedonia national team.

International career
After making his senior debut for Sweden in a January 2014 friendly match against Iceland, Mitov Nilsson decided On 25 September 2015 to switch national teams to Macedonia, which he is eligible for since his mother was born in Macedonia. He made his first appearance for the Macedonia national football team on 12 October 2015 against Belarus in the UEFA Euro 2016 qualifiers.

Career statistics

References

External links
 

Profile at Macedonian Football 

1991 births
Living people
Sportspeople from Norrköping
Swedish people of Macedonian descent
Association football goalkeepers
Swedish footballers
Sweden under-21 international footballers
Sweden youth international footballers
Sweden international footballers
Mitov Nilsson
Mitov Nilsson
Dual internationalists (football)
IFK Norrköping players
IF Sylvia players
GIF Sundsvall players
Sarpsborg 08 FF players
Allsvenskan players
Superettan players
Ettan Fotboll players
Mitov Nilsson
Expatriate footballers in Norway
Mitov Nilsson
Footballers from Östergötland County